The Australian Home Companion and Band of Hope Journal, also published as the Australian Band of Hope Review, and Children's Friend, The Australian Band of Hope Journal, and The Band of Hope Journal and Australian Home Companion, was a Fortnightly English language newspaper published in Sydney, Australia from 1856 to 1861.

History
The paper was established to promote temperance among young people. It was published as the Australian Band of Hope Review, and Children's Friend in 1856, The Australian Band of Hope Journal in 1857, and The Band of Hope Journal and Australian Home Companion in 1858. From 1859 to 1861 it was published as The Australian Home Companion and Band of Hope Journal.

Digitisation
The paper has been digitised as part of the Australian Newspapers Digitisation Program project of the National Library of Australia. It was digitised in June 2011, in the first collaboration between the Digitisation and Photography Branch of the National Library of Australia and the Australian Newspapers Digitisation Program team.

See also
List of newspapers in Australia
List of newspapers in New South Wales

References

External links

Defunct newspapers published in Sydney
1856 establishments in Australia
Newspapers on Trove